Harald McPike (born 1958) is a Bahamas-based Austrian billionaire, and a 36% owner of Starling Bank.

He was born in Zürich, Switzerland in 1958. He grew up in Austria, and in the 1980s, studied economics at the University of Vienna.

McPike is the founder of the Bahamas-based quantitative investment manager QuantRes.

He is married to Joann McPike, the founder of Think Global School. He is based in The Bahamas.

McPike has been to the North and South Poles, and wants to go into space. In 2014, he paid a US$7 million deposit to Virginia company Space Adventures towards a lunar orbit for $150 million, and in 2019 after two years of litigation settled with the company.

References

Living people
Austrian billionaires
1958 births
Businesspeople from Zürich
University of Vienna alumni